Louis Côté is a Canadian retired ice hockey defenseman and right wing who was a two-time All-American for Vermont.

Career
Cote was a star defenseman for Vermont in the 1970. He was one of the first big recruits for the program after it moved up to Division I in 1974–75. In each of his four years with the Catamounts Cote was better than a point-per game player and helped the Catamounts transition into becoming a viable team at the top level of college hockey. Cote was named as an All-American for his junior and senior season despite missing 10 games in his final campaign. He left Vermont as the programs all-time leader in scoring by a defenseman and continued to hold that position as of 2021.

After graduation, Cote continued his playing career. He appeared briefly for the Carolina Thunderbirds in 1980 before heading to Japan. He played three years for Sapporo and then signed on with Chamonix HC, playing hockey on his third continent. He left France for a season to play with the Dundee Rockets but quickly returned and eventually joined the French National Team. He played in three separate World Championships but was unable to help France earn a promotion to the top tier. Cote retired in 1991, shortly after being inducted into the Vermont Athletic Hall of Fame.

Statistics

Regular season and playoffs

International

Awards and honors

References

External links

1956 births
Living people
Ice hockey people from Montreal
Canadian ice hockey defencemen
Canadian ice hockey right wingers
AHCA Division I men's ice hockey All-Americans
Vermont Catamounts men's ice hockey players
Dundee Rockets players
Carolina Thunderbirds players
Chamonix HC players
Ours de Villard-de-Lans players
Gothiques d'Amiens players
Canadian expatriate ice hockey players in France
Canadian expatriate ice hockey players in the United States
Canadian expatriate ice hockey players in Scotland
Canadian expatriate ice hockey players in Japan